Hong Kong competed at the 1956 Summer Olympics in Melbourne, Australia.

Athletes
 Kin Man Cheung (1932 Borneo-?)
  Men's 100 m Free Style
 Men's 100 m Backstroke
 Shiu Ming Wan (1938 Hong Kong-?)
  Men's 100 m Free Style
 Men's 400 m Free Style

References
Official Olympic Reports
Hong Kong

Nations at the 1956 Summer Olympics
1956 Summer Olympics
1956 in Hong Kong sport